Paul William Smith (born 15 October 1954 in Thorne, Doncaster) is a former professional footballer who played as a midfielder in the Football League for Huddersfield Town and Cambridge United.

References

1954 births
Living people
People from Thorne, South Yorkshire
Footballers from Doncaster
English footballers
Association football midfielders
Huddersfield Town A.F.C. players
Cambridge United F.C. players
English Football League players